The 1955 RAC Tourist Trophy took place on 17 September, on the roads around Dundrod, (County Antrim, Northern Ireland).  It was also the fifth round of the F.I.A. World Sports Car Championship, however it was the first championship race following the horrendous tragedy at Le Mans. It was also the Golden Jubilee year for the RAC Tourist Trophy. Going into the race, Ferrari were leading the Manufacturers Championship by four points from Jaguar. Victory for the Italian marque would put them in a strong position to win a third successive title.

Report

Entry

A grand total of 64 racing cars were registered for this event, of which 55 arrived for practice and qualifying. Scuderia Ferrari entered a pair of Ferrari 857 Monzas for regulars Eugenio Castellotti and Piero Taruffi, and Umberto Maglioli and Maurice Trintignant, alongside a 750 Monza for the partnership of Olivier Gendebien and Masten Gregory. Their closest championship rivals, Jaguar, brought just one D-Type to Northern Ireland for Mike Hawthorn and Desmond Titterington. Hoping to keep the championship alive, Officine Alfieri Maserati sent two of their 300S and an A6GCS over. Amongst their line-up were Jean Behra and Luigi Musso.

From West Germany, Daimler-Benz AG entered three of their Mercedes-Benz 300SLRs to tackle the 7.41 mile circuit. The cars were to be driven by Juan Manuel Fangio and Karl Kling, Stirling Moss and John Fitch, and André Simon joined by team newcomer Wolfgang von Trips. With works entries also from the likes of Aston Martin and Porsche, an incredible fifteen manufactures were represented in the field.

Qualifying

In qualifying, the number 10 Mercedes-Benz of Moss and Fitch emerged with the fastest lap. Alongside them was the Hawthorn/Titterington Jaguar. A Ferrari was in third place, driven by Gendebien and Gregory, followed by Fangio/Kling. The third Mercedes, of von Trips and Simon, would start the race from seventh.

Race

Following an accident in practice, the Ferrari 857 Monza of Gendebien and Gregory did not start.

The race was held over 84 laps of the 7.416 miles Dundrod Circuit, giving a distance of 622.936 miles. To make matters worse, the race started in warm conditions, but it would not remain dry. Despite this, the German marque would finish in the first three places.

As the flag dropped, it was Moss who led the incredible array of cars around the County Antrim countryside. As there was an obvious threat of rain, this motivated the drivers to push a little harder at the beginning of the race than normal for a seven-hour event. But with so many cars, on such a tight and dangerous circuit, racing at high speed, on par with Le Mans, the TT was balancing between safety and catastrophic danger. There was no margin for error. Mercedes driver John Fitch had already publicly criticized the safety of the Dundrod circuit.

While everyone was looking forward to a Mercedes/Jaguar duel, the Tourist Trophy was marred by tragedy, within the first few laps of the race. The Cooper-Climax T39 of Jim Mayers, who was sharing the car with Jack Brabham, hit a concrete pillar and the car immediately burst into a ball of flame. Mayers was killed instantly. This explosion caught out the approaching William Smith, at the wheel of a Connaught AL/SR. Smith plowed straight into Mayers and perished just a little while later. The deaths of two more drivers shortly after the horrific events previously at Le Mans only added to the numbness for many.

Meanwhile, Moss was strong right from the start, as was Hawthorn. Hawthorn pushed his Jaguar D-Type as hard as he had when he won at Le Mans. He set the fastest lap of the race, averaging a speed of nearly 95 mph.

With a lead of one and a half minutes, the right rear tyre on Moss's 300 SLR began to throw its tread and tore through the rear-end bodywork. Incredibly, Moss managed to bring the car back to the pits, even with the damaged bodywork and shredded tyre. The mechanics set to work changing the tyre and pulling away some of the dangling bodywork. Having lost a lot of time, Moss and his co-driver Fitch drove flat-out in an effort to catch up with Hawthorn, and with it a shot at the win.

As the rain began to fall on the Irish countryside, the accidents kept on coming. In the first two laps, a total of nine cars were eliminated due to accidents. Of course, two of those were fatal, but then on lap 35, Richard Manwaring lost control of his Elva-Climax Mk I and crashed off the track. As a result of this crash, a third driver lost his life. It was clear that the cars of that day were out-pacing the roads upon which they were competing. Incredibly dangerous, the combination of fast cars and narrow lanes still made for some entertaining action. And, despite the deaths, the crowd remained, watching Hawthorn and Titterington trying to hold off Moss and Fitch.

Once the repairs had been made to the number 10 300SLR, Moss and Fitch managed to bring the car up to second place overall behind the sole works Jaguar D-Type. Still, Hawthorn and Titterington managed to hold off Mercedes, turning some truly fast laps around the Dundrod circuit.

With the finish in sight, the Jaguar remained in the lead ahead of the Mercedes, despite everything that Moss and Fitch could do, the Jaguar was just too far out of reach. But, all of a sudden, Hawthorn came to a screeching halt, just a few miles from the finish line. The Jaguar's engine seized, leaving the Coventry marque without any hope of winning the race, or even finishing. Although slowed by the damage and weather conditions, Moss and Fitch had been unable to close down the gap enough to be able to challenge for the lead. It was clear that Mercedes were "gifted" the race.

As a result, car number 10 (Daimler-Benz AG), took an impressive victory, winning in a time of 7hrs 03:11 mins., averaging a speed of 88.321 mph. The retirement of the Jaguar led to Mercedes being able to take a sweep of the top three positions. Second place went to Fangio, for the second year in a row, and Kling, one lap down. The podium was complete by the other 300SLR, that of von Trips and Simon, two laps adrift. Meanwhile, the Aston Martin DB3S of Peter Walker and Dennis Poore were the best of the English entrants, finishing in fourth place, with the best of the works-Maserati further behind in fifth.

One of the outstanding drives of the race came from Peter Collins, whose Aston Martin DB3S was left stranded at the start due to a seized starter motor. Once the mechanics got the engine started, a furious Collins set off after the pack. After what must have been an astonishing first lap, he had climbed up to 14th. By lap 31, Collins had caught and passed Fangio for third before handing the car over to Tony Brooks, who was only able to complete a few laps before the Aston's engine expired.

Official Classification

Class Winners are in Bold text.

 Fastest Lap: Mike Hawthorn, 4:42.000secs (94.671 mph)

Class Winners

Standings after the race

Note: Only the top five positions are included in this set of standings. Championship points were awarded for the first six places in each race in the order of 8-6-4-3-2-1. Manufacturers were only awarded points for their highest finishing car with no points awarded for positions filled by additional cars. Only the best 4 results out of the 7 races could be retained by each manufacturer. Points earned but not counted towards the championship totals are listed within brackets in the above table.

References

Dundrod
RAC Tourist Trophy
RAC Tourist Trophy